Xysticus gulosus is a species of crab spiders in the family Thomisidae. It is found in North America.

References

 Bradley, Richard A. (2012). Common Spiders of North America. University of California Press.
 Ubick, Darrell (2005). Spiders of North America: An Identification Manual. American Arachnological Society.

External links

 NCBI Taxonomy Browser, Xysticus gulosus

Thomisidae
Spiders described in 1880